George Arnold McCarther (March 28, 1932 – July 1, 1994), better known as George "Crybaby" Cannon, was a Canadian pro wrestler and wrestling manager, best known as manager of the Fabulous Kangaroos.

Professional wrestling career
Cannon was born in Montreal, Quebec as George Arnold McCarther, and spent some time in the Canadian Football League with what are now the Saskatchewan Roughriders. He began wrestling in Japan in 1953. He wrestled for a while in Canada beginning in 1955, left for a time, and returned for good in 1959. He got the nickname "Crybaby" from his ability to wipe sweat from his face, making it look as though he were weeping.

Cannon hosted a weekly variety show on KTLA-TV in Los Angeles from 1968 to 1970, when he returned to Canada. It was after his return to Canada that he managed the Kangaroos. The team feuded with The Stomper and Ben Justice in a storyline in which the Kangaroos supposedly broke The Stomper's leg. The teams feuded for two years, during which time The Stomper continually tried to get revenge by attacking Cannon.

Also in 1968 he wrestled in the World Wide Wrestling Federation as Crybaby Cannon in New York City and the Northeast where he fought against Gorilla Monsoon, Virgil the Kentucky Butcher, Toru Tanaka, and Baron Mikel Scicluna. 

As a manager, he often came to the ring wearing a battle helmet and a ring jacket emblazoned across the back in large capital letters with the phrase "I AM RIGHT", with "CANNON" above that.

Cannon worked for the American-based International Wrestling Association run by Eddie Einhorn in 1975. McCarther  performed many duties, including wrestling, managing wrestlers, and booking events. Cannon was also involved in several other areas of wrestling, including publishing magazines and hosting a wrestling television show taped in Windsor, Ontario called Superstars of Wrestling, which was nationally syndicated throughout Canada during the early 1980s. He later partnered with World Wrestling Federation owner Vince McMahon but later became unable to continue his duties due to phlebitis. Cannon continued to promote small wrestling shows until dying of cancer on July 1, 1994.

Championship and Accomplishments
NWA Los Angeles
NWA International Television Championship (Hollywood) (1 time)
Pro Wrestling Illustrated
Manager of the Year (1975)

See also
List of professional wrestling promoters

References

External links
 Article on Gary Will's Canadian Wrestling Page of Fame

1932 births
1994 deaths
20th-century Canadian people
Canadian expatriate professional wrestlers in the United States
Canadian male professional wrestlers
Professional wrestling announcers
Professional wrestling executives
Professional wrestling managers and valets
Saskatchewan Roughriders players
Sportspeople from Montreal
Professional wrestling promoters
Deaths from cancer
20th-century professional wrestlers
Professional wrestlers from Montreal
NWA "Beat the Champ" Television Champions
NWA Americas Tag Team Champions